The fifth edition of the Gent–Wevelgem women's race (also known as Gent-Wevelgem In Flanders Fields) was held on 27 March 2016. It was a one-day road women's cycling race in Belgium. It was included in the inaugural Women's World Tour, coming as the fourth round of the competition. Dutch rider Chantal Blaak won the race after a solo attack.

Route

Kemmelberg

The Kemmelberg is the emotional centrepiece of the race. This edition, the second ascent of the Kemmelberg was addressed via its steepest road. The first ascent was via the traditional route with a maximum gradient of 17%, but the second was addressed via this steeper road, which has a maximum gradient of 23% near the top. Race director Hans De Clercq stated that it is a tribute to the historical significance of the Kemmelberg, as it is that road being used the first time the Kemmelberg was included in the men's race, in 1955. According to COTACOL, a Belgian standard work that has examined and graded every climb in the country, the "new" Kemmelberg ascent is the toughest climb in all Flemish races. They have given it an overall score of 183 points, which is more than the Koppenberg, the Muur van Geraardsbergen or the traditional Kemmelberg road.

Results

Gallery

See also
 2016 in women's road cycling

References

Gent-Wevelgem
Gent-Wevelgem
Gent–Wevelgem
UCI